32nd BSFC Awards
December 11, 2011

Best Film: 
The Artist
The 32nd Boston Society of Film Critics Awards, honoring the best in filmmaking in 2011, were given on December 11, 2011.

Winners

Best Film:
The Artist
Runner-up: Hugo and Margaret
Best Actor:
Brad Pitt – Moneyball
Runner-up: George Clooney – The Descendants and Michael Fassbender – Shame
Best Actress:
Michelle Williams – My Week with Marilyn
Runner-up: Meryl Streep – The Iron Lady
Best Supporting Actor:
Albert Brooks – Drive
Runner-up: Max von Sydow – Extremely Loud & Incredibly Close
Best Supporting Actress:
Melissa McCarthy – Bridesmaids
Runner-up: Jeannie Berlin – Margaret
Best Director:
Martin Scorsese – Hugo
Runner-up: Michel Hazanavicius – The Artist
Best Screenplay:
Steven Zaillian and Aaron Sorkin – Moneyball
Runner-up: Kenneth Lonergan – Margaret
Best Cinematography:
Emmanuel Lubezki – The Tree of Life
Runner-up: Robert Richardson – Hugo
Best Documentary:
Project Nim
Runner-up: Bill Cunningham New York
Best Foreign-Language Film:
Incendies • Canada
Runner-up: A Separation (Jodaeiye Nader az Simin) • Iran and Poetry (Shi) • South Korea
Best Animated Film:
Rango
Best Editing:
Christian Marclay – The Clock
Runner-up: Thelma Schoonmaker – Hugo
Best New Filmmaker:
Sean Durkin – Martha Marcy May Marlene
Runner-up: J. C. Chandor – Margin Call
Best Ensemble Cast:
Carnage
Runner-up: Margaret
Best Use of Music in a Film (TIE):
The Artist
Drive
Runner-up: The Descendants

External links
 Past Award Winners

References
 'The Artist' Tops Boston Critics Awards; 'Margaret' Gets Multiple Runner-Up Prizes IndieWire

2011
2011 film awards
2011 awards in the United States
2011 in Boston
December 2011 events in the United States